Laura Escudé is an American artist, music technology trainer, entrepreneur, and live show designer. She has programmed and designed shows for artists including Kanye West, Jay Z, American Idol, Herbie Hancock and Porter Robinson, as well as composed and performed string arrangements for Kanye West and Jay Z.

In 2008, Escudé became the world's first Ableton Certified Trainer, implementing the software in many high grossing live shows around the world.

With her professional experience as a controllerist and sound designer, Escudé founded Electronic Creatives, an Ableton-Certified Training Center where she trains and produces talented and sought-after music programmers and controllerists in the industry. Electronic Creatives also offers professional live show designing services to various artists, as well as courses for music production and playback engineering.

Over the years, a new generation of music programmers and live show designers she has trained have gone on to tour with prominent artists such as The Weeknd, Harry Styles, Ariana Grande, Mariah Carey,  and Logic.

When she is not working on live shows, Escudé spends her time creating new sounds under the moniker Alluxe. As an artist, Laura's signature "future classical" sound fuses avant-garde and classical with live electronica to create a unique, hybrid style of electronic music.

Early life and education 

Born in Pensacola, Florida, Escudé was trained as a classical violinist and pianist from the early age of 6. She began pursuing the violin more seriously and became the Concertmaster of Rogers High School in Newport, Rhode Island and was awarded the 1997 Governor's Scholar Award to attend the Interlochen Center for the Arts Summer Music Program. She later became the Concertmaster of the Rhode Island Youth Philharmonic .

Aside from her keen interest in music, Escudé was passionate about singing and acting as well and actively participated in school musicals such as The Rocky Horror Picture Show and was involved in many other school events while growing up. Her passion towards fitness and wellness also started young as she was a competitive runner and was the captain of the school's cross-country track and field team.

When she was 18, Escudé received a scholarship to attend Vanderbilt University in Nashville, TN, but transferred to Florida State University after a year to explore more contemporary music in Violin Performance and to pursue a minor in Business. It was there that she started becoming interested in production and became a self-taught music producer. She performed in the Pensacola Symphony Orchestra as well as the Florida State University Symphony. As a student, Escudé would book shows at the campus’ live-music venue, and got the opportunity to meet with various artists as well as professionals in the world of live show design. Over her years in college, she participated in many electronic music festivals and learned by recording over DJ sets.

Career 
Upon graduation in 2002, Escudé taught at the International Academy of Design and Technology in Tampa, Florida and began her violin performance career with the Santa Monica Symphony, Torrance Symphony, Multi-Ethnic Star Orchestra (MESTO), and the Observatory Orchestra.

In 2005, she began working in Technical Support at M-Audio where she went on to do Sales and Artist Relations.

In 2007, Escudé became Ableton’s first West Coast Product Specialist and a few months after, she became the world's first Ableton Live Certified Trainer and became one of the first to implement music software in some of the most prestigious live shows all over the globe.

In 2008, she founded Evotech Audio, a freelance consultancy for musical instruments brands as a product specialist for clients such as Ableton, Dubspot, MacProVideo, FXpansion, Rob Papen, MV Pro Audio, Melodyne, X-Tempo Designs, Namba Gear, Toontrack.

In 2009, Escudé formed Electronic Creatives, an Ableton certified training center, that conducted educational events in the field of music production. One of her first major clients was Kanye West’s engineer, Anthony Kilhoffer whom she assisted in the programming of the Glow in the Dark tour. At that time, she was also touring with Niyaz, an Iranian electronic band, as a violinist and a music programmer. A few months later, she moved to Las Vegas and worked on the pre-production for Cirque du Soleil’s Viva Elvis Show as a programmer.

In 2011, Escudé began going on tours with Kanye West as his official music programmer and live vocal effect designer, and has been his primary playback engineer ever since. Over the years, she also worked with other prominent artists such as Porter Robinson, Demi Lovato, Iggy Azalea, Charli XCX, Logic, The Weeknd, Miguel, Becky G, Missy Elliott, Rita Ora, Solange, Crystal Method, Camila Cabello, Jay-Z, Yeah Yeah Yeahs, Herbie Hancock, Cat Power, Bon Iver, Drake, Silversun Pickups, Garbage, Childish Gambino and M83.

In 2012, Electronic Creatives branched out to provide music programming and live show design services. Electronic Creatives also went on to specialize in building live performance equipment and offered gear rental services to professional artists.

Musical style 

Laura has released music under her own name and as Alluxe. As an artist, Laura’s signature “future classical” sound fuses avant-garde and classical with live electronica to create a unique, hybrid style of electronic music. Escudé complements it with custom LED controllers, vocals and violin, blending original compositions, improvised beats, and violin loops. Escudé's production skills have earned her remix commissions from M83, Polica and Mr. Hudson, and her violin playing can be heard on albums by Kanye West, Jay Z, Big Grams, Hit Boy, Sage Francis, Solillaquists of Sound and in EastWest’s Quantum Leap Silk sound library.

Collaborations 
Alluxe has opened for the likes of Miguel, Garbage, Machinedrum, Robert Rich and Funkstorung and has performed with Miguel, Kiesza, Charli XCX and Iggy Azalea.

Community and empowerment 
Escudé is the creator of the Transmute Retreat, a retreat that allows live performers to experience accelerated transformation in a healthy, relaxed atmosphere focused on self realization and care. In recent years, she has grown to be particularly interested in the area of mental health & wellness for artists after years of professional touring.
Escudé has been known to advocate for and invests in helping other high-performing artists like herself to discover the tools to begin their own transformation in shifting towards a healthy and supportive atmosphere.

As one of the only women in this male-dominated industry, Escudé is widely regarded as “one of the best in the world at this job”. She aims to inspire other women and the next generation through women empowerment conferences and speaking engagements and has been invited as a guest speaker to speak at leading music technology institutions such as the University of Southern California (USC) and Berklee College of Music in both the Boston campus as well as the one in Valencia, Spain.

Discography and performances 
 Live Shows
 2018 American Idol
 2017 Missy Elliot (Programming)
 2017 Logic (Design, programming)
 2016 Kanye West “Saint Pablo Tour” (Programming, Design)
 2016 Charli XCX (DJ, programming)
 2016 Demi Lovato (Programming)
 2015-2016 Miguel “Wildheart Tour” (DJ, programming)
 2015 Iggy Azalea (Musical Direction, programming)
 2015 Kiesza (DJ)
 2015 Becky G (Musical Direction)
 2015 Kanye West (Programming + Vocal Effects)
 2014 Porter Robinson “Worlds Tour” (Live show design)
 2013-2014 Kanye West Yeezus (Playback + Vocal effect
 2014 Mike Posner (Playback, controller design)
 2014 Selena Gomez (playback)
 2014 The Crystal Method (playback, controller design)
 2013-2014 The Weeknd (playback)
 2013 Becky G (playback design)
 2013 Solange (playback design)
 2013 Yeah Yeah Yeahs (keyboard + sfx design)
 2011-2012 Kanye West + Jay-Z “Watch The Throne” tour (playback + vocal effects)
 2012 Kanye West “Dark Fantasy” shows (playback, vocal effects)
 2012 Childish Gambino (playback, keyboard + drum sampling—design)
 2012 Cat Power (playback, keyboard + drum sampling—design)
 2012 Silversun Pickups (playback, keyboard + drum sampling—design)
 2012 Garbage (playback, keyboard + drum sampling—design)
 2011 Kanye West + Jay-Z “Watch The Throne” tour (playback + vocal effects)
 2011 Kanye West  “Dark Fantasy” tour (vocal effects)
 2011 Bon Iver (vocal effects +keyboard sampling—design)
 2011 M83 (vocal effects—design)
 2011 Herbie Hancock “Solo Piano” (custom controller design, playback, keyboards—design)
 2011 Cirque du Soleil “IRIS” (playback—design)
 2011 Wayne Linsey (playback, controller design—design)
 2010 Drake “Away From Home” tour (playback)
 2009 Kanye West “Glow in the Dark” tour (playback—design)
 2009 Cirque du Soleil's VIVA ELVIS (playback)
 2009 Niyaz European Tour (playback, sound design, violin)

Original Music by Albums
 2017 Fervor (single)
 2016 Contrast (EP)
 2015 Stay The Same ft. Mr MFN eXquire (single)
 2014 Hold U ft. Sister Crayon (single)
 2013 NOMAD (EP)
 2010 Pororoca
 2005 Trace Element Human

Remixes
 2014 New Beat Fund – Get Up (Alluxe Official Remix)
 2013 Mr. Hudson – Fred Astaire (Alluxe Official Remix)
 2012 M83 – Steve McQueen (Alluxe Official Remix)
 2012 Polica - Lay Your Cards Out (Alluxe Official Remix)

 Violin Recordings 
 2015 Big Grams “Goldmine Junkie”
 2012 Hit-Boy HitStory mixtape
 2011 Kanye West's “Dark Fantasy” tour H.A.M. Intro -arrangement and recording
 2011 Kanye West & Jay-Z “Watch The Throne” on “Made in America”
 2011 90210 TV Show
 2010 EastWest's Quantum Leap Silk sound library* 2009 Power of the Game documentary
2009 Power of the Game documentary
 2007 PlatEAU “Kushbush”
 2007 Sage Francis “Human The Death Dance”
 2006 As If We Existed

 Filmography
 2008 Kissing Cousins (Violinist)
 2007 ATF: Asian Task Force (Violinist)
 2007 Red Is the Color of (Assistant Sound Editor)
 2006 Welcome Home (Violinist)
 2005 Lovewrecked (Sound Editor)

 Performances 
 2018 Electric Forest Festival (as Alluxe)
 2018 Solar Flux Festival (as Alluxe)
 2012 Paris, France with Emancipator
 2010 Google Cloud Conference
 2010 Dancing With the Stars with Jason Derulo
 2007-2008 Torrance Symphony
 2004-2008 Santa Monica Symphony

References

External links 
 Website 
 Electronic Creatives 

American violinists
Living people
American women in electronic music
Year of birth missing (living people)
21st-century violinists
21st-century American women